Mohammed Mustafa Badawi (10 June 1925 – 19 April 2012) was a scholar of English and Arabic literature. He was a Research Fellow of St. Antony's College at the University of Oxford from 1967 to 1969, and was then elected to the College's Governing Body. Upon retirement in 1992, he became an Emeritus Fellow

Badawi was born in Egypt in 1925. He received as PhD at the University of London in 1954, with a thesis on Coleridge's criticism of Shakespeare, later published in 1973 by Cambridge University Press as Coleridge: Critic of Shakespeare which was re-printed in 2010; according to WorldCat, the book is held in 554 libraries. He then became Assistant Professor of English at the University of Cairo and moved to Oxford University in 1964, where he lectured at Brasenose College until retirement in 1992. He became a fellow of St. Antony's College (1967-2012), where he was  the first lecturer in Modern Arabic at the new Middle East Centre of the college.

Badawi's notable students include: Emeritus Professor Sasson Somekh of Tel Aviv University and Dr. Roger Allen of the University of Pennsylvania

Over his academic career he published over thirty-six books, studies of English literature, of modern Arabic literature, and translations of Arabic literature into English. Upon his retirement he was awarded the King Faisal International Prize in Arabic Literature.

He left an endowment at Oxford University for the payment of the "Mustafa Badawi Prize in Modern Arabic Literature" which is awarded for "the best English essay on some aspect of modern Arabic literature of up to 15,000 words." which demonstrated, "sensitivity to modern Arabic literary texts as well as some originality and skill in critical analysis."

Upon his retirement, a festschrift in his honour was published as a special issue of Journal of Arabic literature

Bibliography

academic works
A Short History of Modern Arabic Literature. Oxford [England]: Clarendon Press, 1993.
(ed.) Modern Arabic Literature. Cambridge [England]: Cambridge University Press, 1992. 
Early Arabic Drama. Cambridge [Cambridgeshire]: Cambridge University Press, 1988. 
Modern Arabic Drama in Egypt. Cambridge: Cambridge University Press, 1987. 
Modern Arabic Literature and the West. London: Ithaca Press for the Board of the Faculty of Oriental Studies, University of Oxford, 1985.
 (with Beeston, A. F. L., Julia Ashtiany, Maria Rosa Menocal, Raymond P. Scheindlin, Michael Anthony Sells, Roger Allen, and D. S. Richards.) The Cambridge History of Arabic Literature. Cambridge: Cambridge University Press, 1983
Background to Shakespeare. London: Macmillan, 1981.
Translated into Japanese by Kenryū Kawauchi; Hideo Kaneya as シェイクスピアとその背景 / Shieikusupia to sono haikei OCLC 673912201
A Critical Introduction to Modern Arabic Poetry. Cambridge [Eng.]: Cambridge University Press, 1975.  "based on lectures delivered at different times at the University of Oxford."

Coleridge: Critic of Shakespeare. Cambridge [Eng.]: University Press, 1973.

Translations into English

Naguib Mahfouz,  The thief and the dogs ; translated from the Arabic by Trevor Le Gassick and M.M. Badawi.	New York : Doubleday, 1984
Ḥaqqī, Yaḥyá, The Saint's Lamp and Other Stories. Leiden: Brill, 1973

Translations into Arabic
Fīlīb lārkīn: Muḫtārāt šiʿriyya. Philip Larkin: Selection. Al-Majlis al-A'lami li-l-Thaqafa, 1998.

Other
“Shakespeare and the Arabs” lecture on the occasion of the quadricentennial in 1964, later published in Cairo Studies in English, 1964/65,
(ed.)  / Aṭlāl : wa-Rasāʼil min Landan (two poetry collections) 
An anthology of modern Arabic verse selected with an introduction by M.M. Badawi. [London]: Published for the trustees of the James Mew Fund by Oxford University Press, 1970. (in Arabic, with English notes).

References

External links 
https://web.archive.org/web/20120423101222/http://www.sant.ox.ac.uk/mec/about.html
http://www.orinst.ox.ac.uk/general/trust_funds/mustafa_badawi_prize_in_modern_arabic_literature.html 
https://web.archive.org/web/20120504022543/http://www.dissentmagazine.org/article/?article=404
http://www.kff.com/EN01/KFIP/KFIPImages/KFIP%20Winners%20Archive-Yearly.pdf 

1925 births
2012 deaths
Alumni of Royal Holloway, University of London
Historians of Arabic literature